Phil Morrison may refer to:

 Phil Morrison (yacht designer) (born 1946), British yacht designer
 Phil Morrison (director), American film and television director
 Phil Morrison (driver) (born 1977), British race driver
 Phil Morrison (baseball) (1894–1955), American baseball player
 Philip Morrison (1915–2005), American physicist
 Philip J. Morrison (born 1950), American physicist
 Philip Crosbie Morrison (1900–1958), Australian naturalist, educator and conservationist

See also
 Phillip Morrison (born 1984), Brazilian swimmer of American descent